

Condenser may refer to:

Heat transfer
 Condenser (heat transfer), a device or unit used to condense vapor into liquid. Specific types include:
 HVAC air coils
 Condenser (laboratory), a range of laboratory glassware used to remove heat from fluids
 Surface condenser, a heat exchange installed in steam-electric power stations to condense turbine exhaust steam into water
 Isolation condenser, an emergency passive system for cooling in some reactors (BWR/2, BWR/3 and SBWR series) in nuclear energy production

Steam engines

 Condensing steam locomotive
 Jet condenser
 Surface condenser

Other uses
 Condensers for collecting atmospheric moisture:
 Air well (condenser)
 Atmospheric water generator
 Condenser (optics), a lens which gathers visible light and directs it onto a projection lens to concentrate it
 Capacitor, formerly called a condenser, an electrical device that stores energy
 Condenser microphone, a capacitor-based microphone that converts sound waves into an electrical signal
 Synchronous condenser, a rotating machine similar to a motor, used to control AC power flow in electric power transmission

See also
 Enlarger
 Köhler illumination
 Projector (disambiguation)
 Telescope